Bellenden Road Nature Garden is a very small nature reserve in Peckham in the London Borough of Southwark. It is managed by the London Wildlife Trust and it opened in August 2010.

The site was established to promote sustainable gardening and nature study for local schools and community groups. It contains a stag beetle loggery, wildflower borders, and a native hedgerow. Wildlife includes common toads, great tits, bees, and butterflies.

Access to the garden is available only by prior arrangement with the Trust.

References

Nature reserves in the London Borough of Southwark
London Wildlife Trust